Murray Byron Kellam was formerly a judge of the County Court of Victoria in Australia before being appointed as a judge on 28 January 1998 to the Supreme Court of Victoria, the highest ranking court in the Australian State of Victoria. He was also the first President of VCAT. On 16 May 2007 Kellam was appointed a judge of Appeal. He retired from the Supreme Court on 15 June 2009. Kellam also served as a member of the Supreme Court of Samoa. He was appointed an Acting Judge of the Supreme Court of the ACT on 8 March 2017.

In 2005, Kellam was made an Officer of the Order of Australia for his contributions to the law, and for his support of disadvantaged people in Thailand and Melbourne.

Kellam was appointed as chief of the Tasmanian Integrity Commission from 2010 to 2015. When he stepped down, Kellam was critical of the Tasmanian Government for failing to create the offence of misconduct in public office.

In July 2014 Kellam was appointed by the Independent Broad-based Anti-corruption Commission (IBAC) to conduct the Kellam Review into Victoria Police human source management relating to the role of Nicola Gobbo.

Kellam holds a Bachelor of Laws and a Bachelor of Jurisprudence from Monash University. He also holds a Master of Laws (LLM) from Melbourne University.

See also
 Judiciary of Australia
 List of Judges of the Supreme Court of Victoria
 Victorian Bar Association
 National Alternative Dispute Resolution Advisory Committee

Notes

External links
 Supreme Court of Victoria Website

Year of birth missing (living people)
Judges of the Supreme Court of Victoria
Judges of the Supreme Court of the Australian Capital Territory
20th-century Australian judges
21st-century Australian judges
Australian judges on the courts of Samoa
Monash Law School alumni
Living people
People educated at Carey Baptist Grammar School
Judges of the County Court of Victoria